

In basketball, points are the sum of the score accumulated through free throw or field goal. The National Collegiate Athletic Association's (NCAA) Division I is the highest level of amateur basketball in the United States. The NCAA did not split into its current divisions format until August 1973. From 1906 to 1955, there were no classifications to the NCAA nor its predecessor, the Intercollegiate Athletic Association of the United States (IAAUS). Then, from 1956 to 1973, colleges were classified as either "NCAA University Division (Major College)" or "NCAA College Division (Small College)". This is a comprehensive list (through the 2011–12 season) of all occurrences of an NCAA Division I men's basketball player scoring 60 or more points in a single game. The official NCAA men's basketball media guide includes two lists: one listing all 60+ point games against Division I opponents and the other listing all 60+ point games against non-Division I opponents.

The all-time record against a Division I opponent is 72 points. It was set by U.S. International's Kevin Bradshaw, a  guard, on January 5, 1991, against Loyola Marymount in the highest-scoring game in Division I history. Loyola Marymount defeated U.S. International 186–140. Bradshaw shot 23 for 59 in field goal attempts overall (7 of 22 from three-point range) and made 19 of 23 free throws in his record-setting performance. After the game, Bradshaw reflected on the achievement, "I'm still completely stunned. I wasn't gunning for the record until the last 10 minutes. That's when the bench became aware of the mark and the coaches allowed me to go for it. I won't be celebrating because we lost the game." He also remarked on how he was even able to put himself in the position to break Pete Maravich's record of 69 points: "Our style of play allows for the freelancing that we do. I have to put up the ball a lot because we don't have a lot of shooters on the team."

Among the players who have scored 60+ points against Division I opponents, only LSU's Maravich, Oral Roberts' Anthony Roberts and Ole Miss' Johnny Neumann appear on the list more than once. Maravich's four career 60+ point games is the most in NCAA Division I history. Five players who achieved the feat against a Division I opponent—Maravich, Calvin Murphy, Oscar Robertson, Lew Alcindor (later Kareem Abdul-Jabbar) and Elgin Baylor—are all inductees in the Naismith Memorial Basketball Hall of Fame. Meanwhile, three players who achieved the feat against non-Division I opponents are also Hall of Fame inductees: Paul Arizin, Elvin Hayes, and Bob Pettit.

The highest scoring performance in NCAA Division I basketball history, regardless of the opponent's classification, is 100 points, scored by Frank Selvy of Furman against Newberry College on February 13, 1954. He made a still-standing NCAA record 41 field goals on 66 attempts. He made his final shot of the game—scoring his 99th and 100th points—with only two seconds remaining on a 40-foot attempt. Selvy later said, "I'll say that I made at least eight or nine baskets that would have been three-pointers today. Plus they didn't have the one-and-one in those days." The performance occurred during Selvy's senior season in which he led the nation in scoring at 41.7 points per game. He also led the nation in scoring the previous year at 29.5 points per game. Coincidentally, a teammate of Selvy's for one season, Darrell Floyd, is the only player who has scored 60 or more points against both a Division I and a non-Division I opponent. Floyd scored 62 points against The Citadel (Division I) and 67 against (then) non-Division I Morehead State.

Key

Against Division I opponents

Against non-Division I opponents

Some of the opponents on this list that are currently Division I universities were not classified as Division I schools at the time the 60-point game occurred. Five of the opposing schools in this list—Morehead State, Saint Peter's, Mercer, Marshall, and Valparaiso—are present-day Division I schools.

See also
List of National Basketball Association players with most points in a game
List of basketball players who have scored 100 points in a single game

References
General

Specific

NCAA Division I men's basketball statistical leaders